Tara Leigh-Anne Watchorn (born May 30, 1990) is a Canadian women's ice hockey player who has competed for the Canadian national women's ice hockey team. She made her debut for Team Canada in the 2010 Four Nations Cup and played for Canada most recently at the 2014 Winter Olympics. She chose to withdraw from playing in the 2018 Olympics, however a future comeback is still possible. Watchorn was born in Ajax, Ontario, but grew up in Newcastle, Ontario.

Playing career
Watchorn competed for the Durham West Jr. Lightning in Ontario. She won silver in the PWHL tournament in her junior year and bronze as a sophomore. She represented Team Ontario in the National Under 18 tournament and won a championship. She was picked as the High School Athlete of the Year as a freshman at St. Stephens secondary school in Bowmanville. Watchorn earned MVP honors for basketball, volleyball, soccer and hockey.

NCAA
In her freshman season (2008–09) with Boston University, Watchorn played in every game. Her six goals led all defenders on the Terriers roster. On October 23, she earned her first career goal in a 3–2 win against New Hampshire. Two days later, she registered three assists in an 8–1 win against Maine. She was twice Named Hockey East Rookie of the Week.

During the 2009–10 season, Watchorn competed in 31 contests. Her fourteen assists were good enough for third overall among defenders in Hockey East. She was a member of the Hockey East All-Star Team that played the U.S. Women's National Team on Nov. 22. On November 14, she accumulated three assists in 5–3 win over Providence. An injury prevented her participation in the MLP Cup. The highlight of the season was getting the championship-winning goal against Connecticut in the Hockey East title game

Watchorn participated in the NCAA tournament for the first time. Against Mercyhurst in the NCAA quarterfinals (on March 13, 2010), she scored the Terriers lone goal.

In her junior season (2010–11), she registered a shorthanded goal and an assist against Union on Oct. 9. Six days later, she had a goal and an assist against Wayne State.

Hockey Canada
In a January 9, 2008 contest versus Germany (contested at the inaugural World Women's Under-18 hockey championship), Watchorn logged two goals (plus one assist) in a 10–1 win. Watchorn competed with the Canadian Under 22 team in the January 2010 MLP Cup. She won gold and tallied an assist in the tournament. She was part of the Canadian National Under 22 team that competed in the 2011 MLP Cup. She played for Canada at the 2014 Winter Olympics, scoring one goal in five games.

CWHL
Originally drafted by Team Alberta, she signed with the Boston Blades as a free agent in autumn 2014. She would contribute to the Blades winning the 2015 Clarkson Cup. During the 2014–15 CWHL season, Watchorn led all blueliners in scoring, and was named the recipient of the CWHL Defenseman of the Year Award in 2015. In the autumn of 2015, she was named team captain of the Blades.

Career stats

NCAA

Hockey East play

Hockey Canada

CWHL

Awards and honours

NCAA
 2009 Women's Division I New England Hockey Writers All-Star team
 2009 Women's Division I New England Hockey Writers All-Rookie team
 2010 Hockey East All-Tournament Team honors
 2010 All-Hockey East Second Team
 2010 Women's Division I New England All-Star
 Hockey East Co-Player of the Week (Week of March 15, 2010)
 Hockey East Defensive Player of the Week honors on March 8, 2010
 Hockey East Honor Roll (October 19, 2009)
 Hockey East Honor Roll (November 16, 2009)
 Hockey East Honor Roll (February 1, 2010)
 Hockey East Honor Roll (October 11, 2010)
 Hockey East 10th Anniversary Team selection, Honorable Mention

CWHL
CWHL co-leader, Plus-Minus rating +25 (2014–15)
2015 CWHL Defenceman of the Year Award

References

External links
 
 
 
 
 

1990 births
Boston Blades players
Boston University Terriers women's ice hockey players
Canadian women's ice hockey defencemen
Clarkson Cup champions
Ice hockey people from Ontario
Ice hockey players at the 2014 Winter Olympics
Living people
Medalists at the 2014 Winter Olympics
Olympic gold medalists for Canada
Olympic ice hockey players of Canada
Olympic medalists in ice hockey
People from Ajax, Ontario
Canadian expatriate ice hockey players in the United States